Santo Wayburn Jeger (20 May 1898 – 24 September 1953) was a British Labour Party politician who served as a Member of Parliament (MP) from 1945 until his death.

Born in London, Jeger was educated at University College, Cardiff and the London and St Mary's Hospitals. A doctor by profession, Jeger was a founder of the Socialist Medical Association. He served as a councillor on Shoreditch Borough Council from 1925 and was Mayor of the Borough 1929–1930 and the Chairman of the Borough's public health committee for six years, establishing a number of clinics and public health schemes. He represented Shoreditch on the Metropolitan Boroughs Standing Joint Committee. Jeger was elected to the London County Council in 1931, serving until 1946. He was active in providing medical aid to the Republicans in the Spanish Civil War.

Jeger stood for Parliament without success in 1935 general election in St Pancras South East but won the seat at the 1945 general election. He was elected in the two subsequent elections in 1950 and 1951 for the new seat of Holborn and St Pancras South. He died in 1953 aged 55 and was succeeded as Member of Parliament in the ensuing by-election by his widow, Lena Jeger.

References

External links 
 

1898 births
1953 deaths
Labour Party (UK) MPs for English constituencies
Members of Shoreditch Metropolitan Borough Council
Members of London County Council
Alumni of Cardiff University
Alumni of the London Hospital Medical College
UK MPs 1945–1950
UK MPs 1950–1951
UK MPs 1951–1955
Jewish British politicians
Spouses of life peers